Jason Ryan Quitugua Cunliffe (born 23 October 1983) is a Guamanian footballer who plays as a striker and midfielder for Bank of Guam Strykers in the Guam Soccer League, and is the current captain of Guam.

Youth and club career
Cunliffe first played for Guam’s Tumon Soccer Club at the age of five. He was part of the Houston Texans team that won two youth national championships in 2001 and 2002, and was part of the 2001 Texans team that won the Brazil Cup. Cunliffe played for the NCAA Division I men’s soccer team, the Santa Clara University Broncos, including playing for its 2003 team that competed in the NCAA Final Four.

From 2010 to 2012, he played for Guam Shipyard in the Guam Men's Soccer League. In 2012, he signed for Philippine side Pachanga in the United Football League.

After his stint with the Philippine club, Cunliffe returned home to Guam to join Rovers FC. He played for the Rovers from 2013 to 2018, including the 2017 AFC Cup playoff qualifiers. He then moved to Bank of Guam Strykers FC and played for them at the 2018 Guam FA Cup.

International career
He first represented Guam at youth level for its under-16 national team. He made his senior debut in the 2006 AFC Challenge Cup, with his first match as a starting player on 3 April 2006 against the host nation, Bangladesh. Since 2006, Cunliffe has become a mainstay in the national team and has been captain since 2012.

He made his first hat-trick for Guam in the 2013 EAFF East Asian Cup match against the Northern Mariana Islands, which helped them to win 3–1. He scored another hat trick against Bhutan in a 2022 World Cup qualifier on 11 June 2019, which ended 5–0 for Guam.

He made his 50th international cap on September 4, 2018 in Guam's match against Macau at the 2019 EAFF Football Championship. He is the first Guam national team player to achieve the said feat.

International goals
Scores and results list Guam's goal tally first.

|-
| 1. || 15 March 2009 || Leo Palace Resort Soccer Ground, Yona, Guam ||  ||style="text-align:center;"| 2–2 ||style="text-align:center;"| 2–2 || 2010 East Asian Football Championship || 
|-
| 2. || 23 August 2009 || National Stadium, Kaohsiung, Taiwan ||  ||style="text-align:center;"| 2–2 ||style="text-align:center;"| 2–9 || 2010 East Asian Football Championship || 
|-
| 3. || 19 June 2010 || Oleai Sports Complex, Saipan, Northern Mariana Islands ||  ||style="text-align:center;"| 1–1 ||style="text-align:center;"| 1–1 || Friendly ||
|-
| 4. || 3 September 2011 || Stade Rivière Salée, Nouméa, New Caledonia ||  ||style="text-align:center;"| 1–0 ||style="text-align:center;"| 1–4 || 2011 Pacific Games || 
|-
| 5. || 5 September 2011 || Stade Rivière Salée, Nouméa, New Caledonia ||  ||style="text-align:center;"| 1–0 ||style="text-align:center;"| 1–1 || 2011 Pacific Games ||
|-
| 6. || rowspan="3"| 18 July 2012 || rowspan="3"| Leo Palace Resort Soccer Ground, Yona, Guam || rowspan="3"|  ||style="text-align:center;"| 1–1 || rowspan="3" style="text-align:center;" | 3–1 || rowspan="3"| 2013 EAFF East Asian Cup || rowspan="3"|
|-
| 7. ||style="text-align:center;"| 2–1
|-
| 8. ||style="text-align:center;"| 3–1
|-
| 9. || 22 July 2012 || Leo Palace Resort Soccer Ground, Yona, Guam ||  ||style="text-align:center;"| 1–0 ||style="text-align:center;"| 3–0 || 2013 EAFF East Asian Cup || 
|-
| 10. || rowspan="2"| 6 March 2013 || rowspan="2"| Thuwunna Stadium, Yangon, Burma || rowspan="2"|  ||style="text-align:center;"| 1–0 || rowspan="2" style="text-align:center;" | 3–0 || rowspan="2"| 2014 AFC Challenge Cup || rowspan="2"| 
|-
| 11. ||style="text-align:center;"| 3–0
|-
| 12. || 16 November 2013 || New Laos National Stadium, Vientiane, Laos ||  ||style="text-align:center;"| 1–1 ||style="text-align:center;"| 1–1 || Friendly || 
|-
| 13. || rowspan="2"| 27 March 2014 || rowspan="2"| Trinidad Stadium, Oranjestad, Aruba || rowspan="2"|  ||style="text-align:center;"| 1–1 || rowspan="2" style="text-align:center;" | 2–2 || rowspan="2"| Friendly || rowspan="2"| 
|-
| 14. ||style="text-align:center;"| 2–1
|-
| 15. || 13 November 2014 || Taipei Municipal Stadium, Taipei, Taiwan ||  ||style="text-align:center;"| 1–0 ||style="text-align:center;"| 2–1 || 2015 EAFF East Asian Cup || 
|-
| 16. || 16 November 2014 || Taipei Municipal Stadium, Taipei, Taiwan ||  ||style="text-align:center;"| 1–1 ||style="text-align:center;"| 1–4 || 2015 EAFF East Asian Cup || 
|-
| 17. || 31 March 2015 || Jalan Besar Stadium, Jalan Besar, Singapore ||  ||style="text-align:center;"| 2–1 ||style="text-align:center;"| 2–2 || Friendly || 
|-
| 18. || 6 November 2016 || Mong Kok Stadium, Mong Kok, Hong Kong ||  ||style="text-align:center;"| 1–3 ||style="text-align:center;"| 2–3 || 2017 EAFF East Asian Cup|| 
|-
| 19. || 2 September 2018 || MFF Football Centre, Ulaanbaatar, Mongolia ||  ||style="text-align:center;"| 3–0 ||style="text-align:center;"| 4–0 || 2019 EAFF E-1 Football Championship||
|-
| 20. || rowspan="3"| 11 June 2019 || rowspan="6"| Guam FA National Training Center, Dededo, Guam || rowspan="3"|  ||style="text-align:center;"| 2–0 || rowspan="3" style="text-align:center;" | 5–0 || rowspan="3"| 2022 FIFA World Cup qualification || rowspan="3"|
|-
| 21. ||style="text-align:center;"| 4–0
|-
| 22. ||style="text-align:center;"| 5–0
|-
| 23. || rowspan="3"| 22 February 2022 || rowspan="3"|  ||style="text-align:center;"| 1–1 || rowspan="3" style="text-align:center;" | 3–2 || rowspan="3"| Friendly || rowspan="3"|
|-
| 24. ||style="text-align:center;"| 2–2
|-
| 25. ||style="text-align:center;"| 3–2
|}

References

1983 births
Living people
People from Hagåtña, Guam
Guamanian footballers
Guam international footballers
Quality Distributors players
Guam Shipyard players
Santa Clara Broncos men's soccer players
Expatriate footballers in the Philippines
Association football forwards
Chamorro people